Cyathochaeta clandestina is a sedge of the family Cyperaceae that is native to Australia.

The plant blooms between October and December producing brown flowers.

In Western Australia it is found along the coast along the margins of streams and in swampy areas along the coast of the South West and Great Southern regions where it grows in sandy soils.

References

Plants described in 1878
Flora of Western Australia
clandestina
Taxa named by Robert Brown (botanist, born 1773)